Xiaolin may refer to:
 Siaolin Village, village in Jiasian District, Kaohsiung, Taiwan, Republic of China
 Xiaolin, Cixi (逍林镇), town in Cixi City, Zhejiang, People's Republic of China
 Xiaolin, Sui County, town in Sui County, Suizhou, Hubei, China
 Zhu Xiaolin (朱晓琳), Chinese long-distance runner 
 Xiaolin Showdown, American animated television series

See also 
Shaolin (disambiguation)
Shaolin Temple (disambiguation)